Marshall Creek  or Marshalls Creek may refer to:

Marshall Creek (North Moreau Creek), a stream in Missouri
Marshall Creek, Texas, a neighborhood of Roanoke, Texas

Marshalls Creek (Pennsylvania), a stream in Pennsylvania
Marshalls Creek, Pennsylvania, an unincorporated community in Pennsylvania

See also
Marshallkreek, Suriname